Red plum can refer to:

 Endiandra introrsa, a tree commonly known as Red Plum
 Valassis, a company that markets itself using the name Redplum